John Mitchel's GAC Glenullin is a Gaelic Athletic Association club based in Glenullin, County Londonderry, Northern Ireland. The club is a member of the Derry GAA. They currently cater for both Gaelic football and camogie.

Glenullin fields Gaelic football teams at U8, U10, U12, U14, U16, Minor, Reserve, and Senior levels. Underage teams up to U-12's play in North Derry league and championships, from U-14 upwards teams compete in All-Derry competitions.

2019 Championship Football

2018 Championship Football

2017 Championship Football

History
In May 1925 Johnny Mullan (Seán Ó Maoláin), the local school teacher, called a meeting with the aim of establishing a new Gaelic football club in Glenullin. The club decided to name itself after Irish rebel John Mitchel and wore green and white hooped jerseys. The first ever match took place that summer against a team from Randalstown, County Antrim. The team colours have now changed to green and gold hoops.

Glenullins original football pitch was Tinkers Park in Coolcoscreghan townland, on the junction of the Lisnascreghog and Glen roads. This field is now livestock grazing. Their original meeting hall is a green metal building with a red roof on the Glenullin Road at the junction with Lisnascreghog Road. Sadly, this piece of their history has been abandoned and allowed to fall into disrepair. Their current pitch beside the council sink estate in Curraghmore was opened in 1973.

Glenullin at the time played in South Derry competitions. They were soon successful and won the 1927 Derry Senior Football League and the 1928 Derry Senior Football Championship. They were also victorious in the 1934 South Derry League. A branch of the Gaelic League was also formed in Glenullin around this time.

Glenullin switched to North Derry competitions in 1938. They won back-to-back Dr. Kerlin Cups in 1938 and 1939. Glenullin won the 1939 South Derry? League final. 1940 proved a very successful year for Mitchel's; they won the Dr. Kerlin Cup, the Neal Carlin Cup and the North Derry Championship. They won their third North Derry Championship in 1944. They won the Neal Carlin Cup again in 1947.

1951 was the year John Mitchel's first wore the green and gold hoops, which they currently wear today. Glenullin, like much of rural Ireland was greatly affected by emigration in the 1950s. Due to lack of numbers the club was relegated to the Junior ranks. The club won the North Derry Junior title in 1953. Glenullin re-emerged in the 1960s to become a force in Derry football once more. The side won the 1962 North Derry Minor and All-Derry Minor titles. The Seniors won the Dr. Kerlin Cup in 1964.

In 1977 Glenullin defeated Desertmartin to become Derry Intermediate Football Champions. 1985 proved a glory year for Glenullin. They won their first Derry Senior Championship in 58 years by defeating Ballinderry in the final at Dean McGlinchey Park, Ballinascreen. In 2007 they defeated another South Derry "giant", Bellaghy in a replay, this giving them their first Derry Championship success in 22 years. They were managed that year by Liam Bradley, and joint captain with Brian Mullan was his son Paddy. They went on to the provincial semi-final against St Galls, but lost in an out-of-sorts performance from their key players.

In 2010, Glenullin player Eoin Bradley brought shame upon the club, assaulting referee Declan O'Connor by punching him in the face. The incident ended up in court with Bradley being convicted and fined for the assault. The shame did not end there however. In 2017, Glenullin were due to play a match against Loup. When they discovered that Declan O'Connor was scheduled to referee, they refused to field a team which ended up costing them 3 league points.

Only one goalkeeper has ever won player of the year 2 years in a row, Kevin McNicholl (Phaidi Hamish).

Glenullin also hold another unique record. The oldest player in the U18 league. Frankie McNicholl (Phaidi Hamish) played for U18s whilst 32 years of age. He was so small and light, it was never questioned at the time. He was from a poor farming family and couldn't afford proper football boots so played games in his Sunday shoes.

The first time Glenullin won the championship, it was with Frankie McNicholl, 6 of his brothers and 6 cousins named McNicholl. The game was played in the club's original ground Tinkers Park against Ballinascreen. According to GAA records, all the spectators could see was a field of small McNicholl men laying the opposition flat on their backs.

Well known players

Dermot McNicholl – All Star winner and member of Derry's 1993 All-Ireland winning team as well as captain of the 1983 All-Ireland minor football winning team.  He played in 3 All-Ireland minor finals, the 1st when he was only 14.  He won 3 Sigerson and 2 Ryan cup medals with UUJ.  He had a spell in Australia playing Australian Rules football with St Kilda.  He represented Ireland in the Compromise Rules series' on many occasions, often as one of the most influential players.  He was also captain of the Glenullin team which won the Derry CHampionship in 1985 and won an Ulster Championship with Derry in 1987 and 1993.
Paddy Bradley – 2007 All Star.
John Eddie Mullan – Former Derry player. While he played most of his club football for Dungiven, he played with Glenullin for a year in 1943.

Football Titles

Senior
Ulster Senior Club Football League: 3
2007, 2014, 2016
Derry Senior Football Championship: 3
1928, 1985, 2007
Derry Senior Football League: 2
1927, 2008
Derry Intermediate Football Championship: 
1977, 2022
James O'Hagan Cup
1993, 1995, 2005, 2006, 2007, 2016
Dr. Kerlin Cup 6
1938, 1939, 1942, 1945, 1964, 2005

Minor
Derry Minor Football Championship: 3
1962, 1981, 1982
Tommy O'Neill Cup 1
1998, 2001,
Derry Minor 'B' Football Championship: 1
2018
Derry Minor 'C' Football Championship: 1
2015
North Derry Minor 'B' Football Championship: 2
1989, 2001
North Derry Minor Football League: 1
1986
North Derry Minor 'B' Football League: 2
1989, 1993

Under-16
North Derry Under-16 Football Championship: 2
1980, 1996
North Derry Under-16 'B' Football Championship: 2
2001, 2006
North Derry Under-16 Football League: 1
1999
North Derry Under-16 'B' Football League: 1
2001
North Derry Under-16 'C' Football League: 1
2007

Under-14
Derry Under-14 'A' Football League: 1
1995
Derry Under-14 'C' Football League: 1
2007,2008

Note: The above lists may be incomplete. Please add any other honours you know of.

See also
Derry Senior Club Football Championship
List of Gaelic games clubs in Derry

References

Gaelic games clubs in County Londonderry
Gaelic football clubs in County Londonderry
Gaelic Athletic Association clubs established in 1925